Erwin Stoff (born 26 April 1951 in Vorona) is a Romanian-born American film producer. He is best known for being the president of company 3 Arts Entertainment, Inc., based in Beverly Hills, CA. Among his credits are The Matrix, Beautiful Creatures, Edge of Tomorrow, and 13 Hours: The Secret Soldiers of Benghazi. He is of Romanian-Jewish background.

Filmography
He was a producer in all films unless otherwise noted.

Film

Second unit director or assistant director

Miscellaneous crew

Thanks

Television

References

External links

1951 births
American film producers
American people of Romanian-Jewish descent
Living people
Romanian emigrants to the United States